Ampelopsin may refer to:
 Ampelopsin, a flavanonol
 Ampelopsin A, a stilbene oligomer
 Ampelopsin B, a stilbene oligomer
 Ampelopsin C, a stilbene oligomer
 Ampelopsin D, a stilbene oligomer
 Ampelopsin E, a stilbene oligomer
 Ampelopsin F, a stilbene oligomer

References